Nina Ben Ami was the Israeli Ambassador to Uruguay from 2014 until 2018 and vice-consul in Montreal.

Originally from Rockville, Maryland, Ben Ami graduated from Rockville High School (Maryland), the Woodrow Wilson School of Public and International Affairs at Princeton University and the University of Haifa.  Ben Ami was also a Fulbright Scholar in Israel.

References

Ambassadors of Israel to Uruguay
Israeli women ambassadors
Princeton School of Public and International Affairs alumni
University of Haifa alumni
People from Rockville, Maryland
Year of birth missing (living people)
Living people